Inge Niedermayer (born 10 May 1959) is an Austrian rower. She competed in the women's double sculls event at the 1984 Summer Olympics.

References

External links
 

1959 births
Living people
Austrian female rowers
Olympic rowers of Austria
Rowers at the 1984 Summer Olympics
Place of birth missing (living people)